The latent TGF-beta binding proteins (LTBP) are a family of carrier proteins.

LTBP is a family of secreted multidomain proteins that were originally identified by their association with the latent form of transforming growth factors. They interact with a variety of extracellular matrix proteins  and may play a role in the regulation of TGF beta bioavailability.

Genes

References

External links
 
 PDBe-KB provides an overview of all the structure information available in the PDB for Human Latent-transforming growth factor beta-binding protein 1